Eben Newton (October 16, 1795 – November 6, 1885) was an American lawyer and politician who served one term as a U.S. Representative from Ohio from 1851 to 1853.

Early life and career 
Born in Goshen, Connecticut, Newton attended the common schools. He moved to Portage County, Ohio, in 1814 and engaged in agricultural pursuits. He studied law with Darius Lyman and John Sloane. Newton was admitted to the bar in 1823 and commenced practice in Canfield, Ohio. He formed a partnership with Elisha Whittlesey that lasted for twenty years. He served as member of the Ohio Senate from 1842 to 1851. He was the presiding judge of the court of common pleas from 1844 to 1851.

Congress 
Newton was elected as a Whig to the Thirty-second Congress (March 4, 1851 – March 3, 1853). He was an unsuccessful candidate for reelection in 1852 to the Thirty-third Congress.

Later career 
He served as president of the Ashtabula & New Lisbon Railroad 1856–1859, and again served in the state senate from 1862 to 1864 during the American Civil War. He resumed the practice of law and also engaged in agricultural pursuits. He raised beef cattle on farms near Canfield.

Newton married Mary Church of Canfield, May 1826. They had one son and three daughters. He was a Presbyterian.

Death
He made a trip to California, returning with a cold, which led to his death within a month. He died in Canfield, Ohio, on November 6, 1885, and was interred in Canfield Village Cemetery.

References

 

1795 births
1885 deaths
19th-century American railroad executives
People from Goshen, Connecticut
People from Canfield, Ohio
Ohio lawyers
Ohio state senators
People from Portage County, Ohio
Whig Party members of the United States House of Representatives from Ohio
19th-century American politicians
19th-century American lawyers